Shastra (IAST:) is a Sanskrit word that means "precept, rules, manual, compendium, book or treatise" in a general sense. The word is generally used as a suffix in the Indian literature context, for technical or specialigzed knowledge in a defined area of practice.

Shastra has a similar meaning to English -logy, e.g. ecology, psychology, meaning scientific and basic knowledge on a particular subject. Examples in terms of modern neologisms include
  'physics', 
  'chemistry', 
  'biology', 
  'architectural science', 
  'science of mechanical arts and sculpture',
  'science of politics and economics',
and #  'compendium of ethics or right policy'.

In Western literature, Shastra is sometimes spelled as Sastra, reflecting a misunderstanding of the IAST symbol 'ś', which corresponds to the English 'sh'.

Etymology 
The word Śāstra literally means "that which has been instructed/decreed", from the root Śāsana which means "instruction/decree".

Terminology
"Shastra" commonly refers to a treatise or text on a specific field of knowledge. In early Vedic literature, the word referred to any precept, rule, teaching, ritual instruction or direction. In late and post Vedic literature of Hinduism, Shastra referred to any treatise, book or instrument of teaching, any manual or compendium on any subject in any field of knowledge, including religious. It is often a suffix, added to the subject of the treatise, such as 
 Yoga-shastra, 
 Nyaya-shastra, 
 Dharma-shastra, 
 Koka- or Kama-shastra, 
 Moksha-shastra, 
 Artha-shastra, 
 Alamkara-shastra (rhetoric), 
 Kavya-shastra (poetics), 
 Sangita-shastra (music), 
 Natya-shastra (theatre & dance) and others.

In Buddhism, a "shastra" is often a commentary written at a later date to explain an earlier scripture or sutra. For example, Yutang Lin says that a text written by him and not given by Buddha, cannot be called a "Sutra"; it is called a "Sastra". In Buddhism, Buddhists are allowed to offer their theses as long as they are consistent with the Sutras, and those are called "Sastras."

In Jainism, the term means the same as in Hinduism. An example of Jaina Shastra is the 12th-century Yoga Shastra of Hemchandracharya.

Shastra is sometimes the root of compounded Sanskrit words. A custodian of Shastra, for example, is called Shastradhari (Sanskrit: शास्त्रधारी).

References in the early texts
The term is found in several passages of the Rigveda (2nd millennium BCE), such as in hymn VIII.33.16.

In this Rigvedic verse, the term means rule or instruction. 

The Maitri Upanishad (mid to late 1st millennium BCE), similarly, mentions the materialist Charvakas and Brihaspati who disagreed that the Vedas are a treatise of knowledge, proposing relativism instead, in the following passage:

The term is found in other Upanishads as well as in Bhagavad Gita such as in verses 15.20, 16.23–16.24, and 17.1.

The  (11.36; 14.30) uses the term Shastra to refer to the  tradition. ,  and 's  use the term. Similarly, the  uses the term to refer to astronomical treatises.

The term "" is found in Yaska's Nirukta (1.2, 14), where the reference is to Nirukta (etymology).

Chronology and authenticity
Shastras are predominantly post-Vedic literature, that is after about 500 BCE. However, it is unclear when various Shastras were composed and completed. The authenticity of the manuscripts is also unclear, as many versions of the same text exist, some with major differences. Patrick Olivelle, credited with a 2005 translation of Manu Dharma-sastra, published by the Oxford University Press, states the concerns in postmodern scholarship about the presumed authenticity and reliability of manuscripts as follows (abridged):

The literature of late 1st millennium BCE such as Arthashastra, and Shastras of various fields of knowledge from the early 1st millennium period is of great interest as it helped the emergence of diverse schools and the spread of Indian religions such as Hinduism and Buddhism in and outside South Asia.

The shastras are both descriptive and prescriptive. Among the various Shastras, Manu's code of law has been among the most studied as the colonial British government attempted to establish different laws in British India based on Sharia for Muslims and Manu's code of law.

The shastras are not consistent or a single consensus documents. Dharma-sastras, for example, contain opposing views and contradictory theories. This is in part because they represent an ideal of human behaviour, while at the same time recognising the need to account for likely failings.  The shastras do not present  life as it was lived. Rather they reveal an idea of what life should be. The shastra texts constitute one of the great bodies of literature of the ancient world.

Sutra

Sutras are another genre of Indian texts that emerged in the 1st millennium BCE, particularly after the 600 BCE. Sutra (literally "binding thread") denotes a distinct type of literary composition from Shastra. In Sanskrit, "sutra" typically referred to one or more aphorisms; hence sutras use short, aphoristic, evocative statements. In contrast, a Shastra is typically longer, with more detail and explanations. An example of a Sutra is Patanjali's Yogasutras (considered a classic Hindu treatise), while an example of Shastra is Hemachandra's Yogasastra (considered a classic Svetambara Jain treatise), both on yoga.

Shastras and Sutras are among the numerous other genres of literature that has survived from ancient and medieval India. Other genres include Vedas, Upanishads, Vedangas, Itihasa, Puranas, Bhasyas, and Subhashitas.

Major shastras by topics 

  

 List of Shastras
 Vastu Shastra (treatises on architecture)
 Vaimānika Shāstra, early 20th-century, sanskrit text on "science of aeronautics"
 Dharma Shastra:These a genre of Sanskrit theological texts, and refers to the treatises (śāstras) of Hinduism on dharma. There are many Dharmashastras, variously estimated to be 18 to about 100, with different and conflicting points of view. Each of these texts exist in many different versions, and each is rooted in Dharmasutra texts dated to 1st millennium BCE that emerged from Kalpa (Vedanga) studies in the Vedic era.
 Kamashastra (Kama Shastra)
 Yoga Vasistha
 Moksopaya (mahayana uttaratantra shastra)
 Artha Shastra, financial affairs
 Natya Shastra, performing arts 
 Surya Siddantha, astronomy
 Mahayana Buddhist Shastras
 Samudrika Shastra
 Shilpa Shastra

See also 

 Vaimānika Shāstra
 Dharmaśāstra
 Kamashastra (Kama Shastra)
 Yoga Vasistha
 Mokshopaya (mahayana uttaratantra shastra)
 Arthashastra
 Mahayana sutras
 Samudrika Shastra
 Shilpa Shastras

Notes

References 

Sanskrit words and phrases
Sanskrit texts